Co-op Food is a brand used for the food retail business of The Co-operative Group in the United Kingdom.

Prior to reintroducing the brand in 2016, the group used "The Co-operative" branding, which is still used by a number of consumers' co-operative societies in the UK. Other societies use their own branding.

In 2016, the Co-operative Food accounted for approximately 6.6% of the UK groceries market.

Operations

The "Co-op" brand is used by over 3,500 shops owned by various societies which make up the co-operative movement, including the Central England Co-operative and the Midcounties Co-operative. A number of co-operative societies including Scotmid and the Lincolnshire Co-operative prefer to use the 1992 'cloverleaf version' of The Co-operative brand. In May 2016, The Co-operative Group reverted to the use of its 1968 Co-op cloverleaf branding.

In March 2009, The Co-operative Group acquired the Somerfield supermarket retailer for £1.57bn from a group of private equity investors. The Somerfield Head Office in Bristol was subsequently closed and the grocery stores were either sold to rivals or integrated into its own Co-op Food division. In 2016, The Co-operative Group sold 298 smaller convenience stores to McColl's.

The majority of products sold in "Co-op Food" shops are sourced collectively through Co-operative Federal Trading Services although stocking decisions and pricing are determined by the individual businesses.

List of UK Co-operatives with food retail operations
Though often considered to be one supermarket business, The Co-operative Food is a network of supermarkets and convenience shops owned and operated by over 15 independent co-operative societies, many of which have adopted the 2008 version of The Co-operative brand. In total there are over 4,000 co-operative food shops in the UK. The table below indicates how many food shops each co-operative society operates.

Work with Amazon  
In 2021, the Co-op started selling food online through Amazon, using robots to deliver groceries. The move was criticised by the GMB union, which has been campaigning for improved worker rights at Amazon.

Distribution

Co-op Supply Chain Logistics is the distribution business of The Co-operative Group that manages the national and international distribution of goods on behalf of all the food retailing co-operative societies who are members of Co-operative Federal Retail Trading Services. The Co-operative Group manages all of its own warehouses and most of its own transport operations, although several distribution centres use third party logistics partners to manage their transport operations. Supply Chain Logistics Head Office is co-located at the Birtley Distribution Centre.

Co-op Supply Chain Logistics has 9 regional distribution centres (RDCs) and 3 smaller local service centres (LSCs) servicing the outer extremities of the UK. The Coventry-based National Distribution Centre (NDC) supplies all distribution centres with slower moving ambient lines and tobacco.

Membership

Members of The Co-operative Group and participating regional societies earn one membership point for every £1.00 spent at The Co-operative Food. Points are converted into dividend at a rate agreed annually by the Board.

In September 2016, The Co-operative Group launched a new membership, decreasing the amount members earn from 5% to 2%, and increasing the amount spent on charity from 1% to 2%.

Product ranges
Co-op Food ranges currently are (as of May 2016):
 Co-op – standard own brand range
 Irresistible – premium food and drink
 Free From – suitable for customers with food allergies
 Gro – Vegetarian own brand range
 Honest Value – Low price range

Co-op Food ranges formerly were:
 Loved By Us – standard own brand range
 Truly Irresistible – premium food and drink
 Home Baking – home baking range
 Simply Value – low price range

In November 2020, the "Honest Value" range was launched as a lower priced range.

Delivery Robots

Starting in March 2020  Starship Technologies delivery robots can delivery goods directly to customers from stores in  Cambourne, Milton Keynes and Leeds area's of the UK.

See also
 Co-operative Retail Trading Group
 British co-operative movement

References

External links
 Co-op Food
 Co-op Food Shop Finder

Supermarkets of the United Kingdom
Supermarkets of Northern Ireland
Food
Convenience stores of the United Kingdom